Legislative elections were held in Greece on Sunday, 20 September 2015, following Prime Minister Alexis Tsipras' announced resignation on 20 August. At stake were all 300 seats in the Hellenic Parliament. This was a snap election, the sixth since 2007, since new elections were not due until February 2019.

The elections resulted in an unexpectedly-large victory for Alexis Tsipras' Coalition of the Radical Left (SYRIZA), which fell just six seats short of an absolute majority and was able to reform its coalition government with the right-wing Independent Greeks (ANEL). Opposition center-right New Democracy (ND) remained stagnant at 28% and 75 seats, despite pre-election opinion polls predicting a tie with Syriza or even opening the possibility of a ND government. Far-right Golden Dawn (XA) remained the third political force in the country rising slightly to 7%, while the Democratic Alignment (comprising PASOK and DIMAR) rose to 4th place nationally, as a result of the failure of the Communist Party of Greece (KKE) to increase its vote tally and the decline of To Potami. The Union of Centrists (EK) entered Parliament for the first timey, while Syriza-splinter group Popular Unity fell short of the required 3% threshold and did not win parliamentary representation.

Turnout was exceptionally low at 56.16%, the lowest ever recorded in a Greek legislative election since the restoration of democracy in 1974. Post-election analysis determined that voters' apathy and disaffection with politics and weariness after being continuously called to the polls (this election marked the third vote throughout 2015, after the January 2015 election and the July 2015 referendum) were the most likely causes for the low turnout.

Background

Third bailout agreement

Several days after the bailout referendum, on 12 July 2015, the Greek Prime Minister, Alexis Tsipras came to an agreement with lenders for a new ESM program. Greece will receive a loan of up to €86 billion, which will be received gradually from 2015 until June 2018, including a buffer of up to €25 billion for the banking sector. In return, Greece will have to streamline the VAT system and broaden the tax base to increase revenue, reform the pension system, safeguard the full legal independence of the Hellenic Statistical Authority, automatically cut public spending to generate primary surpluses, reform justice with a view to accelerate the judicial process and reduce costs, implement all OECD toolkit I recommendations, modernise labour market legislation, modernise and strengthen the Greek administration, revoke the laws passed by the Tsipras government counter to the February 20 agreement—except for the one concerning the "humanitarian crisis"— or identify clear compensatory equivalents for the vested rights that were subsequently created (e.g. for the rehiring of fired public servants), recapitalize the banks, and privatize 50 billion of state assets. To help support growth and job creation in Greece up to 2020, the European Commission will help mobilise up to €35 billion to fund investment and economic activity, including in SMEs. The Investment Plan for Europe will also provide funding opportunities for Greece.

On 14 August, after a rancorous all-night debate, the Hellenic Parliament backed the country's new bailout deal, although more than 40 MPs from Syriza either voted against the deal or abstained, and Tsipras had to rely on the support of three opposition parties: New Democracy, The River and PASOK. Following the Parliament's decision, the Eurogroup welcomed the agreement between Greece and its lenders, and initiated the launching of the national procedures required for the approval of the new ESM program. These national procedures were concluded by 19 August, and Greece received the first disbursement of the initial tranche of up to €26 bn.

Government's resignation and snap election
Although Tsipras passed the bailout agreement through the Parliament and did not face a no-confidence motion, the fact that 43 of Syriza's 149 MPs had either opposed the bailout or abstained meant that he had effectively lost his parliamentary majority. Therefore, on 20 August, following the first disbursement of the initial tranche of the third bailout agreement, Tsipras submitted the resignation of his government to Prokopis Pavlopoulos, the President of Greece. Tsipras asked Pavlopoulos for the earliest possible election date (20 September), and publicly argued that "the present Parliament cannot offer a government of majority or a national unity government." In a televised address to the Greek people, Tsipras recognised that he did not achieve the agreement he expected before the January elections. Following Tsipras' resignation, the Constitution required Pavlopoulos to ask the second- and third-largest party in Parliament to form a government.

Some analysts' expectations that these two parties—and especially New Democracy—could waive their three-days exploratory mandate right to accelerate the procedures were not confirmed. Vangelis Meimarakis, the Leader of the Opposition, received the first exploratory mandate on 21 August, stating that he has the "political obligation and responsibility to exhaust all the options". Failing to form a government, Meimarakis returned the mandate to the President on 24 August. The same day, Panagiotis Lafazanis, the president of the third-largest party in Parliament, the newly formed Popular Unity, was handed the third and final exploratory mandate. Popular Unity was founded on 21 August by 25 anti-austerity and anti-bailout MPs, who split from Syriza and were largely affiliated to the party's Left Platform. After having failed to attract coalition partners for a new government, Lafazanis returned the mandate on 27 August. In a meeting with Pavlopoulos, Lafazanis asked the President to set a date for election no earlier than 27 September and to convene a council meeting of political leaders. However, given that Syriza, the Independent Greeks and the Communist Party had made clear that they had no interest in participating in such a meeting, Pavlopoulos opted for entering into telephone consultations with each political leader individually. After the conclusion of these consultations, which proved to be fruitless, Pavlopoulos named Vassiliki Thanou, President of the Court of Cassation (Areios Pagos), as interim prime minister, with the task of leading Greece to the elections. On 28 August, Pavlopoulos issued a presidential decree for the dissolution of the Parliament and the holding of a snap legislative election on 20 September 2015. The President's decision not to convene the council meeting of political leaders and to call the elections earlier than 27 September was fiercely criticised by Lafazanis; in an official statement, Popular Unity called the President's actions "a raw and provocative violation of both the letter and the spirit of the Constitution". However, other prominent politicians of the Opposition, such as PASOK's Evangelos Venizelos, who is also a Professor of Constitutional Law, suggested that Pavlopoulos acted within the rules and without violating the Constitution.

Electoral system
All voters are required to vote, with registration being automatic and voting being mandatory. However, none of the legally existing penalties or sanctions have ever been enforced.

250 seats are distributed on the basis of proportional representation, with a threshold of 3% required for entry into parliament. Blank and invalid votes, as well as votes cast for parties that fall short of the 3% threshold, are disregarded for seat allocation purposes. 50 additional seats are awarded as a majority bonus to the party that wins a plurality of votes, with coalitions in that regard not being counted as an overall party but having their votes counted separately for each party in the coalition, according to the election law. Parliamentary majority is achieved by a party or coalition of parties that command at least one half plus one (151 out of 300) of total seats.

Opinion polls

Graphical summary

Poll results
The tables below list nationwide voting intention estimates. Refusals are generally excluded from the party vote percentages, while question wording and the treatment of "don't know" responses and those not intending to vote may vary between polling organisations. Polls that show their results without disregarding those respondents who were undecided or said they would abstain from voting (either physically or by voting blank) have been re-calculated by disregarding these numbers from the totals offered through a simple rule of three, in order to obtain results comparable to other polls and the official election results. When available, seat projections are displayed below the percentages in a smaller font. 151 seats were required for an absolute majority in the Hellenic Parliament.

Candidates' debates

Results

Aftermath
The governing party SYRIZA won the largest number of seats but fell short of an outright majority. However, the party resurrected its coalition with the right-wing Independent Greeks, a minor party with which it had already formed a government after the January 2015 election. Centre-right New Democracy took the second-largest vote share, while far-right Golden Dawn was a fairly distant third. Popular Unity, the party formed by 26 MPs who had defected from SYRIZA in protest at the bailout, failed to reach the 3% threshold, and thus did not get any seats.

SYRIZA leader Alexis Tsipras hailed the result as a "victory of the people". He returned to the premiership after resigning earlier in the summer in order to force the new election. He told supporters in Athens that Greece would "continue the struggle we began seven months ago" when SYRIZA was first elected to government. New Democracy leader Vangelis Meimarakis swiftly conceded after the election results began coming in, calling upon Tsipras "to create the government which is needed". Tsipras' former finance minister Yanis Varoufakis criticised the election result as "the 'legalisation' of the capitulation", referring to the bailout deal negotiated between Athens and European creditors during the summer.

The margin of SYRIZA's "decisive" victory was a surprise, with many pundits and analysts predicting a closer race with New Democracy. Voter turnout was 7 pp lower than it had been in January.

Notes

References

Greece 2
Legislative 2
2015 09
2015 in Greek politics
 2
Greece